Preacher's Kid is a 2010 American Christian drama film directed by Stan Foster, loosely based on the Parable of the Prodigal Son. Original songs and score are composed by recording artist and music producer Tim Miner. The film was written and directed by Stan Foster, and stars LeToya Luckett, Durrell "Tank" Babbs, Clifton Powell, Gregory Alan Williams, Rae'Ven Larrymore Kelly, Kiki Sheard, Sharif Atkins, Tammy Townsend, and Essence Atkins. The film was released to theaters on January 29, 2010 by Warner Premiere.

Plot
 
Small-town preacher's kid Angie King leaves the church and her Augusta, GA home to pursue a dream of singing stardom. Luckett plays Angie, the daughter of a stern but loving bishop, whose attraction to the hunky star (Tank) of a traveling gospel show takes her on the road...and into romance, heartbreak and the realization that happiness may lie in the home she left behind.

Cast
LeToya Luckett as Angie 
Durrell "Tank" Babbs as Devlin Mitchell
Tammy Townsend  as Desiree
Carlos Davis as Biscuit 
Trey Songz as Monty
Clifton Powell as Ike
Ella Joyce as Sister Watkins 
Rae'Ven Larrymore Kelly as Marcia 
Dawnn Lewis as Mya 
Sharif Atkins as Wynton
Kierra Sheard as Litha
Gregory Alan Williams as Bishop King 
Essence Atkins as Peaches

Release
Preacher's Kid was released to 109 theaters on January 29, 2010. Gen8X committed to donate the film's opening day net proceeds to humanitarian aid for 2010 Haiti earthquake relief through charities such as Smile of a Child, Friend Ships, and Samaritan's Purse. In its opening weekend, it grossed $190,638, which equals $1,749 per theater. The film has accumulated $515,065 to date.

Reception
The film received mixed to positive reviews from film critics. Michael Dequina of The Movie Report said, "Foster's film confirms the unique, undeniable power this genre can achieve on both stage and film..." John Anderson of Variety gave the film a mixed review, saying, "Stan Foster, making his directorial debut, has reared a 'Preacher's Kid' that's largely wooden, unlikely in many spots and, despite the few hard-edges of his script, could have used a tougher sensibility. The results are a movie that doesn't quite know what it wants to be. But, overall it was a good movie."

See also
List of black films of the 2010s

References

External links
 Official website
 
 
 
 

Films about evangelicalism
American independent films
2010 films
American drama films
Warner Bros. films
Films set in Georgia (U.S. state)
2010s English-language films
2010s American films